Robert Burns (born 17 January 1968) is an Australian former cyclist. He competed in the points race at the 1988 Summer Olympics.

References

External links
 

1968 births
Living people
Australian male cyclists
Olympic cyclists of Australia
Cyclists at the 1988 Summer Olympics
Place of birth missing (living people)
Commonwealth Games medallists in cycling
Commonwealth Games gold medallists for Australia
Cyclists at the 1990 Commonwealth Games
Medallists at the 1990 Commonwealth Games